William Stafford-Howard may refer to:

William Stafford-Howard, 2nd Earl of Stafford, Earl of Stafford
William Stafford-Howard, 3rd Earl of Stafford, Earl of Stafford

See also
William Stafford (disambiguation)
William Howard (disambiguation)